Charleston is a city in Mississippi County, Missouri, United States. The population was 5,056 at the 2020 census. It is the county seat of Mississippi County. It is a home to a local correctional facility.

History
Charleston is the largest town on the Missouri side near the confluence of the Mississippi and Ohio rivers at Bird's Point (11 miles east on U.S. Route 60). Its history has been tied to traffic on the rivers.

Settlement initially occurred on the north side, in what in 1805 was called Matthews Prairie.

After purchasing  for $337, Joseph Moore laid out Charleston in 1837. Some say the community derives its name from nearby Charles Prairie, while others believe the name is a transfer from Charleston, South Carolina. In 1845, it was selected as the county seat.  A post office named Charleston has been in operation since 1847.

The Battle of Charleston was fought on August 19, 1861. Killed in the battle were one Union soldier and thirteen Missouri State Guard soldiers.

On September 1, 1861, Confederate General M. Jeff Thompson robbed the Union Bank of Charleston. Thompson, who handed the cashier a note, gave the cashier an hour to get approval from superiors to give him keys to the vault. After receiving the money, he left a receipt for $57,000 and discovered later that only $56,000 was in the bags.

The city was the epicenter of the October 31, 1895 5.9  earthquake on the New Madrid Seismic Zone. The quake damaged virtually every building in Charleston, creating sand volcanoes and cracking a pier on the Cairo Rail Bridge. In addition, chimneys toppled in St. Louis, Missouri; Memphis, Tennessee; Gadsden, Alabama; and Evansville, Indiana. The fate of specific buildings may also be traced by Sanborn maps that were produced of the town during this period. This was the largest quake since the 1812 New Madrid earthquake, which measured at 8.3 and was the biggest recorded quake in the Contiguous United States. One of the most visible signs of the quake is located south of Charleston at Henson Lake, which was greatly expanded by the quake.

In 1901, the county courthouse was built. It was designed by J.B. Legg, who designed numerous buildings throughout Missouri, including the Gasconade and St. Charles County courthouses. On February 10, 1997, the courthouse was damaged by fire and was subsequently torn down.

The Hearnes Site, Missouri Pacific Depot, Moore House, McCutchen Theatre, and Jacob Swank House are listed on the National Register of Historic Places.

Geography
Charleston is situated in northwestern Mississippi County, a few miles west of the confluence of the Mississippi and Ohio rivers at Bird's Point. Interstate 57 passes through Charleston, connecting it with southern Illinois across the Mississippi River to the northeast, and Interstate 55 near Sikeston to the west. U.S. Route 62 and Missouri Route 105 intersect near downtown Charleston.

Demographics

2010 census
As of the census of 2010, there were 5,947 people, 1,705 households, and 1,107 families residing in the city. The racial makeup of the city was 47.55% White, 50.45% Black or African American, 0.03% Native American, 0.32% Asian, 0.61% from other races, and 1.04% from two or more races. Hispanic or Latino of any race were 1.78% of the population.

There were 1,705 households, of which 35.4% had children under the age of 18 living with them, 35.5% were married couples living together, 25.3% had a female householder with no husband present, 4.2% had a male householder with no wife present, and 35.1% were non-families. 32.1% of all households were made up of individuals, and 11.6% had someone living alone who was 65 years of age or older. The average household size was 2.44 and the average family size was 3.05.

The median age in the city was 37.1 years. 20.3% of residents were under the age of 18; 9.6% were between the ages of 18 and 24; 32% were from 25 to 44; 26.4% were from 45 to 64; and 11.6% were 65 years of age or older. The gender makeup of the city was 61.3% male and 38.7% female.

2000 census
As of the census of 2000, there were 4,732 people, 1,834 households, and 1,228 families residing in the city. The population density was 1,011.8 people per square mile (390.4/km2). There were 1,957 housing units at an average density of 418.5 per square mile (161.5/km2). The racial makeup of the city was 53.11% White, 45.60% African American, 0.04% Native American, 0.27% Asian, 0.02% Pacific Islander, 0.15% from other races, and 0.80% from two or more races. Hispanic or Latino of any race were 1.10% of the population.

There were 1,834 households, out of which 32.9% had children under the age of 18 living with them, 39.0% were married couples living together, 24.8% had a female householder with no husband present, and 33.0% were non-families. 30.6% of all households were made up of individuals, and 16.0% had someone living alone who was 65 years of age or older. The average household size was 2.50 and the average family size was 3.13.

In the city, the population was spread out, with 30.2% under the age of 18, 8.5% from 18 to 24, 24.6% from 25 to 44, 20.8% from 45 to 64, and 16.0% who were 65 years of age or older. The median age was 35 years. For every 100 females, there were 82.6 males. For every 100 females age 18 and over, there were 74.7 males.

The median income for a household in the city was $21,812, and the median income for a family was $28,178. Males had a median income of $25,908 versus $17,292 for females. The per capita income for the city was $12,876. About 21.2% of families and 26.0% of the population were below the poverty line, including 41.3% of those under age 18 and 16.8% of those age 65 or over.

Government

 List of Charleston mayors

Education
Charleston R-I School District operates one elementary school, one middle school, and  Charleston High School. Charleston High School has won 12 state boys basketball championships, the most recent being in 2022.

Charleston has a public library, a branch of the Mississippi County Library District.

Notable people
 Charlie Babb, former NFL player for the Miami Dolphins
 Lanie Black, Missouri state legislator
 William H. Danforth, businessman
 Ricky Frazier, former basketball player
 Betty Cooper Hearnes, Missouri politician
 Warren E. Hearnes, former Missouri Governor
 James Boon Lankershim, Los Angeles area landowner and real estate developer
 James Naile, baseball player for the St. Louis Cardinals
 Ernie Nevel, baseball player
 Kenny Rollins, basketball player
 Joseph J. Russell, former member of the State house of representatives in 1886–1890 and served as speaker pro tempore of the house in 1886 and as speaker in 1888
 John E. Scott, former state senate president pro tempore
 Samuel "Bay" Taylor, Negro league baseball player
 Matt Whiteside, baseball player

References

External links

Sanborn Maps of Missouri Collection at the University of Missouri

Cities in Missouri
Cities in Mississippi County, Missouri
County seats in Missouri
Populated places established in 1837
1837 establishments in Missouri